The 10th PTC Punjabi Film Awards ceremony, presented by PTC Punjabi, honored the best Punjabi films of 2019, and will be held online. It is the first time the award is being held online due to the COVID-19 pandemic. The curtain raiser for the awards was held on 29 May 2020 on PTC Punjabi. The award ceremony was online on 3 July 2020, and was hosted by Gurpreet Ghuggi, Divya Dutta, Harish Verma, and Gurnam Bhullar. Ardaas Karaan won the most six awards, including Best Film, Best Actor (for Ghuggi) and Best Director (for Gippy Grewal), followed by Chal Mera Putt, which won three awards including Best Comedy Film and Best Actor critics' (for Amrinder Gill).

Winners and nominees 

 

Winners are listed first, highlighted in boldface, and indicated with a double dagger.

Films that received multiple awards and nominations

References

External links 
 

2020 film awards
Punjabi film-related lists